Lygothrips is a genus of thrips in the family Phlaeothripidae.

Species
 Lygothrips bournieri
 Lygothrips jambuvasi

References

Phlaeothripidae
Thrips
Thrips genera